Sadak is a 1991 Indian Hindi-language romantic thriller film directed by Mahesh Bhatt. It stars Sanjay Dutt and Pooja Bhatt. The film is one of the highest-grossing movies of the year 1991. The film is also fondly remembered for the late Sadashiv Amrapurkar's award-winning performance as the film's villain, Maharani. The film was inspired by the 1976 American movie Taxi Driver. This film was remade in Tamil as Appu (2000). A sequel, Sadak 2, was released on 28 August 2020 in Disney+ Hotstar.

Plot 
Maharani (Sadashiv Amrapurkar) is an evil transgender pimp that runs a brothel. She employs many girls such as Pooja (Pooja Bhatt) and Chanda (Neelima Azeem). Ravi Kishore Verma (Sanjay Dutt), a taxi driver, meets Pooja before she is bought by Maharani, and his friend Gotya (Deepak Tijori) is in love with Chanda. Ravi previously witnessed his sister Roopa (Soni Razdan) plunge to death after being diagnosed with STD. She had eloped with her lover who sold her off at a brothel and forced her to become a prostitute. This violent incident left Ravi traumatized and scared. He becomes an insomniac who keeps having disturbing visions of his sister's death and is restless and violent on occasions. On one of his taxi-plying days, he meets Inspector Irani (Pankaj Dheer), who Ravi recognizes from an article published about the cop when he had won a medal. Ravi drops him off at his destination, refuses to take any money from him, and the cop tells him to come to him if he ever needs the help of any kind.

Ravi meets Pooja again as she tries to flee the brothel of Maharani and tries to help her in vain. He procures his life's savings, a meager sum of thirty thousand rupees from Salim Bhai (Avtar Gill), his taxi's owner and takes out Pooja for one night, posing as her customer. He does so with the help of his friend Gotya, and a pimp Gullu (Mushtaq Khan). Gotya, however, is held as collateral under Maharani's orders in case Pooja is not safely returned. They roam around Bombay, spend some romantic time with each other, during which Ravi tells Pooja that he loves her and would keep on coming back to the brothel for her every night (presumably—so that she is not sold to other customers).

The next night, Ravi mortgages the taxi and goes back to the brothel. He is, however, chided by Maharani who suspects he's either mad or in love with Pooja for offering high sums of money for her on consecutive nights. She also tells Ravi that since he has been running this business for the past thirty years, he knew when Pooja came back in the morning that Ravi did not sleep with her. After much argument, and requests from Ravi and Gotya, Maharani agrees to let him spend the night with Pooja under the condition that he have sex with her in front of her. Ravi agrees, but stabs Maharani, escaping with Pooja in the ensuing chaos. Gotya also grabs his girlfriend Chanda and escapes. They run away to a distant location where Gotya and Chanda get married in a temple with the blessings of Ravi and Pooja. All four come back and take refuge with Salim Bhai.

In the meantime, Maharani's henchmen find the pimp and break his legs. Salim Bhai advises Ravi and Gotya to enlist police protection and Ravi decides to approach Inspector Irani. He assures them of his help and asks them to meet him in the parking lot of an apartment complex at a scheduled time. However, when the four reach there, Maharani and her henchmen are already waiting and attack them with firearms. As the four try to escape, Gotya and Chanda are both shot and Ravi manages to escape with Pooja in Irani's police jeep. Once they reach safety, he calls up Irani and warns him that he will have to pay heavily for his betrayal.

Pooja is, however, captured again by Maharani, after Ravi is tortured and left for dead. Ravi, remembering that the fate of his sister and Pooja are the same, regains his lost strength. He fights his way back to Maharani by killing Inspector Irani and setting ablaze to Maharani's brothel finally killing Maharani and rescuing Pooja. Ravi is jailed for taking law in hands. After his release from jail, Pooja and Ravi are united again forever.

Cast 

Sanjay Dutt as Ravi Kishore Verma
Pooja Bhatt as Pooja
Deepak Tijori as Gotya
Sadashiv Amrapurkar as Maharani, the 'eunuch' brothel madam
Neelima Azeem as Chanda
Avtar Gill as Salim Bhai
Pankaj Dheer as Police Inspector Irani
Gavin Packard as Maharani's Henchman
Mushtaq Khan as Gullu
Javed Khan Amrohi as Pakya
Soni Razdan as Roopa

Crew
Director – Mahesh Bhatt
Music - Nadeem Shravan
Story – Robin Bhatt
Cinematography – Praveen Bhatt
Producer – Mukesh Bhatt
Editor – A Muthu
Art director – M.S.Shinde
Costume design – Anna Singh

Soundtrack 

The soundtrack of the movie is composed by the music duo Nadeem Shravan. All songs were sung by Anuradha Paudwal along with Kumar Sanu, Abhijeet Bhattacharya, Manhar Udhas, Debashish Dasgupta, Junaid Akhtar & Babla Mehta.

The film's soundtrack album sold 5million units, becoming one of the top three best-selling Bollywood soundtracks of the year. The song "Tumhein Apna Banaane Ki" is a popular number till date. However it was a remake of the famous song Chale To Kat Hi Jayega Safar by Pakistani singer Musarrat Nazir. In turn, a remade version of the song was used for 2015 film Hate Story 3.

Awards 
 Sadashiv Amrapurkar won Filmfare Award for Filmfare Award for Best Performance in a Negative Role.

Sequel 

A sequel, Sadak 2, was planned in September 2018. The principal photography of the film began on 18 May 2019, & was released on 28 August 2020 on Disney+ Hotstar. The sequel starring Alia Bhatt and Aditya Roy Kapur alongside Sanjay Dutt and Pooja Bhatt reprising their original roles is directed by Mahesh Bhatt. The film is produced by Mukesh Bhatt and is presented by Mahesh Bhatt and Vishesh Films. The script was penned by Shagufta Rafique and Robin Bhatt.

References

External links 
 

1991 films
1990s Hindi-language films
Films scored by Nadeem–Shravan
Cross-dressing in Indian films
Transgender-related films
Films directed by Mahesh Bhatt
Indian crime drama films
Films about prostitution in India
Hindi films remade in other languages
Films with screenplays by Robin Bhatt
Indian action films
Indian romantic thriller films
Indian LGBT-related films
1991 LGBT-related films
1991 action films
1991 crime drama films
1990s romantic thriller films